WUFR-LP (102.7 FM) is a radio station licensed to Umatilla, Florida, United States.  The station is currently owned by Communication Arts Center.

References

External links
 

UFR-LP
UFR-LP